Solanki Roy (Bengali: শোলাঙ্কি রায়) is an Indian actress who works in Indian television and web series.

Early life 
Roy was born and raised in Kolkata. She studied at Bidhannagar Municipal School and graduated in political science from Bidhannagar College in Kolkata. Later, she did her post-graduation in International Relations from Jadavpur University. She married Shakya Bose, a New Zealand-based banker, in 2018.

Career 
Roy made her first television appearance in ETV Bangla's (Colors Bangla) Bengali serial Kotha Dilam (2014) with the lead character named Sudha. She also played the lead character Meghla opposite to Vikram Chatterjee in Star Jalsha's famous TV serial Ichche Nodee (2015) which was showered with lots of love from audience. She also appeared on Zee Bangla serial Saat Bhai Champa and Star Jalsha serial Phagun Bou. She was playing the role of Dr. Kadambini Ganguly aka Bini in Star Jalsha's period drama Prothoma Kadambini opposite to  Honey Bafna, based on the biography of Bengal's first practising female physician Kadambini Ganguly. Recently, She became Khori Singha Roy in the drama Gantchhora.

In addition, she has also worked in Bengali web series like Dhanbad Blues, Paap and Montu Pilot.

Works

Films 
Baba Baby O (2022)
Shohorer Ushnotomo Dine (2023)

Television

Web series

Mahalaya

References

External links 
 

Living people
Actors from Kolkata
Indian television actresses
Jadavpur University alumni
1994 births